Angela Bowen (February 6, 1936  –  July 12, 2018) was an American dance teacher, English professor, writer, and a lesbian rights activist. She was also the subject of an award winning 2016 documentary.

Early life
Bowen was born on February 6, 1936, in Boston, Massachusetts in an African-American family. She was the sixth of seven children. She lost her father at the age of 2. Bowen trained and taught at the Elma Lewis School of Fine Arts in Roxbury from age 14 to 22.

Bowen graduated in 1992 from the College of Public and Community Service at University of Massachusetts Boston, where she earned a bachelor's degree in Human Services. She earned a master's degree and a Ph.D. from Clark University, where she wrote the first dissertation about Audre Lorde: "Who Said it was Simple:  Audre Lorde’s Complex Connections to Three U.S. Liberation Movements, 1952-1992” The final chapter, "All These Liberations", is included in The Wind is Spirit: The Life, Love, and Legacy of Audre Lorde, a Lambda Literary Award winning bio/anthology by Gloria Joseph. Bowen's doctorate was one of the first Ph.D.'s granted in Women's Studies in the United States. Bowen became the first black woman to earn her doctorate in Women’s Studies from Clark University in 1997.

Career
Bowen co-founded the Bowen/Peters School of Dance with her then husband, drummer Ken Peters in New Haven, Connecticut, in 1963. The school closed down in 1982. After the school's closure, Bowen and Peters divorced and she came out as a lesbian. Bowen became a gay rights activist and served on the board of the National Coalition of Black Lesbians and Gays. She eventually became the co-chair of the organization and served as the editor of the group's magazine. Bowen appeared on a number of television and radio programs, including WBZ-TV and BET to speak about gay rights and feminism.

After receiving her doctorate from Clark in 1997, Bowen became a professor of English and Women's Studies at California State University, Long Beach. She was the first Black woman to join the staff of the Women's Studies department at CSULB in the program's thirty year history. She remained involved with activism while she taught and was the keynote speaker at CSULB's first Lavender Graduation  ceremony.

Bowen was the subject of the 2016 documentary, The Passionate Pursuits of Angela Bowen,  by her partner Dr. Jennifer Abod and Mary Duprey. which won Best Documentary in the "Women's History U.S." category at the 2017 To the Contrary About Women and Girls film festival. Jennifer Abod described the documentary as “important.” She said: “In the canon of documentary films, stories exploring the complexities of Black women’s lives are rarely told: Black feminists are seldom heard nor seen, and Black lesbians are practically invisible. This film is important to anyone who wants to know more about the history of dance and the emergence of the Black LGBTQ movement. Her story inspires anyone interested in trying to be their authentic self, and challenges us to recognize and appreciate how race, class, gender, age, and sexuality can inform decisions and strategies for survival.”

In addition to being subject of books and documentaries, Bowen was an accomplished writer in her life. In addition to her academic writings, she was also a contributor to Gay Community News. In 2017, Bowen was honored for her work and activism by the Astraea Lesbian Foundation for Justice with their Acey Social Justice Feminist Award. The award is given to lesbian, queer or trans people over the age of sixty-two in recognition for their activism and contributions to their respective communities. When Bowen died in 2018 she left a rich archive that had been collected and preserved by Abod. The archive has been donated to Spelman College, which also holds Lorde’s archive.

Personal life and death
Bowen first married Ken Peters in the 1960s; they had three children. They divorced in the 1980s, when she came out as a lesbian. Bowen met Jennifer Abod at a Take Back the Night rally in New Haven in 1979. Jennifer Abod said of their meeting: "I first saw Angela in July 1979 in New Haven, Connecticut. She was a speaker at rally after a citywide candle-lit Take Back the Night march protesting violence against women." They married in 2013. She suffered from Alzheimer's disease.

Bowen died on July 12, 2018, in Long Beach, California, at 82.

References

1936 births
2018 deaths
Activists from Boston
University of Massachusetts Boston alumni
Clark University alumni
California State University, Long Beach faculty
American LGBT rights activists
African-American academics
Lesbian academics
LGBT African Americans
LGBT people from Massachusetts
People with Alzheimer's disease
20th-century African-American people
21st-century African-American people
21st-century American LGBT people